Anders Kaagh (born 18 July 1986) is a retired Danish football player. He has previous represented Aarhus GF, Viborg FF, FC Djursland, Stenløse BK, Herlev IF and HB Køge.

Kaagh was loaned out to the Norwegian club Mandalskameratene in the first half of the 2007 season and scored one goal in 13 matches for the club in the Norwegian First Division.

He signed a contract with HB Køge on 10 July 2012.

On June 28 Vejle Boldklub announced that they had signed a contract with Anders Kaagh, joining the club on Monday, June 30, 2014.

He is the twin brother of Kristian Kaagh, who is also a football player.

References

External links
 

1986 births
Living people
Danish men's footballers
Aarhus Gymnastikforening players
Viborg FF players
Mandalskameratene players
HB Køge players
Vejle Boldklub players
Fremad Amager players
Danish Superliga players
Norwegian First Division players
Danish expatriate men's footballers
Expatriate footballers in Norway
Danish expatriate sportspeople in Norway
Association football forwards
Danish 1st Division players
People from Norddjurs Municipality
FC Djursland players
Herlev IF players
Sportspeople from the Central Denmark Region